Druzhnaya is a rural locality (a village) in Bryukhovskoye Rural Settlement, Yelovsky District, Perm Krai, Russia. The population was 45 as of 2010. There are 3 streets.

References 

Rural localities in Yelovsky District